In sport, a crest is the term used to describe a logo used by a sports club. Such a logo is also often termed a badge. The logos of many clubs are inspired by heraldic design.

The use of the term crest to describe a logo derives from the misconception that a crest refers to any emblem that is heraldic. In heraldry, a crest specifically refers to the element of a coat of arms which appears above a helmet.

Due to the heraldic design of many club logos, they are sometimes regulated in regions with heraldic authorities. In Scotland, some club logos have been deemed "an heraldic device" by the Court of the Lord Lyon. Because heraldic devices must be authorised by this court, some clubs have been required to change their logos to designs which are not heraldic. Alternatively, a club may apply to have its logo authorised by the Court of the Lord Lyon. Similarly, the College of Arms has regulated club logos, with at least 25 football clubs in England and Wales having designs authorised by the College. In those cases, the English Football League was granted heraldic badges, which were subsequently licensed to the appropriate clubs.

See also
 Crest (heraldry)
 Star (sport badge)

References

Logos
Sports symbols
Sports terminology